Below is a list of Canadian plants by genus. Due to the vastness of Canada's biodiversity, this page is divided.

Many of the plants seen in Canada are introduced by either intentionally or accidentally.  N indicated native and X indicated exotic.  Those plants whose status is unknown are marked with a ?.

A | B | C | D | E | F | G | H | I J K | L | M | N | O | P Q | R | S | T | U V W | X Y Z

Ab 

 Abies
 N Abies amabilis – Pacific silver fir, amabilis fir
 N Abies balsamea – balsam fir
 N Abies grandis – grand fir
 N Abies lasiocarpa – subalpine fir
 Abutilon
 X Abutilon theophrasti – velvetleaf, butterprint, Indian mallow

Ac 

 Acalypha
 N Acalypha virginica – Virginia copperleaf, Virginia threeseed mercury
 Acanthospermum
 X Acanthospermum hispidum – hispid greenstripe
 Acer
 X Acer campestre – hedge maple, field maple
 X Acer ginnala – Amur maple, ginnala maple
 N Acer negundo – Manitoba maple, box-elder, ashleaf maple
 N Acer nigrum – black maple, black sugar maple, rock maple
 N Acer pensylvanicum – striped maple, moose maple, goosefoot maple
 X Acer platanoides – Norway maple, Schwedler maple, crimson king maple
 X Acer pseudoplatanus – sycamore maple, Scottish maple, great maple
 N Acer rubrum – red maple, swamp maple, scarlet maple
 N Acer saccharinum – silver maple, soft maple, white maple, silverleaf maple, river maple
 N Acer saccharum – sugar maple, hard maple
 N Acer spicatum – mountain maple
 N Acer × freemanii (A. rubrum × A. saccharinum) – Freeman's maple
 Achillea
 X Achillea filipendulina – fernleaf yarrow
 N Achillea millefolium subsp. borealis – northern yarrow
 N Achillea millefolium subsp. lanulosa – woolly yarrow
 X Achillea millefolium subsp. millefolium – common yarrow, milfoil
 X Achillea ptarmica – false sneezewort, white tansy, sneezewort yarrow, pearl yarrow
 N Achillea sibirica – Siberian yarrow, many-flowered yarrow
 Acinos
 X Acinos arvensis – mother-of-thyme, spring savoury, basil thyme
 Aconitum
 X Aconitum napellus – garden monk's-hood, helmet flower, Venus' chariot, aconite
 X Aconitum variegatum – Manchurian monk's-hood
 X Aconitum × bicolor (A. napellus × A. variegatum) – hybrid monk's-hood, two-coloured wolf's-bane
 Acorus
 N Acorus americanus – sweetflag
 X Acorus calamus – European sweetflag
 Acroptilon
 X Acroptilon repens – Russian knapweed
 Actaea
 N Actaea pachypoda – white baneberry, doll's-eyes
 N Actaea rubra – red baneberry
 N Actaea × ludovici (A. pachypoda × A. rubra) – hybrid baneberry

Ad 

 Adenocaulon
 N Adenocaulon bicolor – trail-plant
 Adiantum
 N Adiantum aleuticum – western maidenhair fern
 N Adiantum capillus-veneris – southern maidenhair fern
 N Adiantum pedatum – northern maidenhair fern, five-finger fern
 N Adiantum viridimontanum – Green Mountain maidenhair fern
 Adlumia
 N Adlumia fungosa – Allegheny vine, climbing fumitory
 Adonis
 X Adonis annua – pheasant's-eye
 Adoxa
 N Adoxa moschatellina – moschatel, muskroot, townhall clock

Ae 

 Aegopodium
 X Aegopodium podagraria – goutweed, snow-on-the-mountain, goat's-foot, ground elder, bishop's weed
 Aesculus
 N Aesculus glabra – Ohio buckeye, fœtid buckeye
 X Aesculus hippocastanum – common horsechestnut
 Aethusa
 X Aethusa cynapium – fool's-parsley

Ag 

 Agalinis
 N Agalinis gattingeri – Gattinger's agalinis  Endangered 
 N Agalinis paupercula – small-flowered purple false-foxglove, small-flowered agalinis
 N Agalinis purpurea – purple false foxglove, large purple agalinis
 N Agalinis skinneriana – Skinner's agalinis  Endangered 
 N Agalinis tenuifolia – slenderleaf purple false foxglove, slenderleaf agalinis
 Agastache
 N Agastache foeniculum – anise hyssop, blue giant hyssop
 N Agastache nepetoides – yellow giant hyssop
 N Agastache scrophulariifolia – purple giant hyssop
 Agoseris
 N Agoseris glauca – pale false-dandelion, prairie agoseris, pale agoseris, pale goat-chicory, large-flowered false-dandelion
 Agrimonia
 X Agrimonia eupatoria – medicinal agrimony, church steeples, European groovebur
 N Agrimonia gryposepala – tall hairy agrimony, tall hairy groovebur
 N Agrimonia parviflora – smallflower groovebur, harvestlice agrimony
 N Agrimonia pubescens – soft groovebur, soft agrimony
 N Agrimonia striata – woodland agrimony, grooved agrimony
 Agropyron
 X Agropyron cristatum – crested wheatgrass
 Agrostemma
 X Agrostemma githago – common corncockle
 Agrostis
 ? Agrostis canina – brown bentgrass
 X Agrostis capillaris – colonial bentgrass, browntop, Prince Edward Island bentgrass, Rhode Island bentgrass
 X Agrostis gigantea – black bentgrass, redtop
 N Agrostis hyemalis – winter bentgrass, ticklegrass
 N Agrostis mertensii – northern bentgrass
 N Agrostis perennans – upland bentgrass, perennial bentgrass
 N Agrostis scabra – rough bentgrass, tickle grass, rough hairgrass, twin bentgrass
 N Agrostis stolonifera – creeping bentgrass, spreading bentgrass

Ai 

 Ailanthus
 X Ailanthus altissima – tree-of-Heaven, Chinese sumac, stinktree, varnish tree

Aj 

 Ajuga
 X Ajuga genevensis – Geneva bugleweed
 X Ajuga reptans – carpet bugleweed, common bugle, creeping bugleweed

Al 

 Alcea
 X Alcea pallida – pale hollyhock
 X Alcea rosea – hollyhock
 Alchemilla
 X Alchemilla filicaulis – thin-stemmed lady's-mantle
 X Alchemilla monticola – hairy lady's-mantle
 Aletris
 N Aletris farinosa – colicroot  Threatened 
 Alisma
 N Alisma gramineum – grass-leaved water-plantain
 N Alisma subcordatum – southern water-plantain
 N Alisma triviale – northern water-plantain
 Alliaria
 X Alliaria petiolata – garlic mustard, hedge garlic
 Allium
 N Allium burdickii – narrow-leaved wild leek
 N Allium canadense – Canada wild onion, meadow garlic, meadow onion
 N Allium cernuum – nodding onion
 X Allium oleraceum – wild garlic
 X Allium sativum – garlic
 X Allium schoenoprasum var. schoenoprasum – chives
 N Allium schoenoprasum var. sibiricum – Siberian chives 
 N Allium stellatum – prairie onion, wild onion
 N Allium tricoccum – wild leek, small wild leek, ramps
 X Allium vineale – field garlic
 Alnus
 X Alnus glutinosa – black alder, European alder
 N Alnus incana – grey alder, white alder, hoary alder, speckled alder
 N Alnus viridis – green alder, mountain alder, American green alder, Siberian alder, Sitka alder
 Alopecurus
 N Alopecurus aequalis – shortawn foxtail
 N Alopecurus alpinus – alpine foxtail
 X Alopecurus geniculatus – water foxtail
 X Alopecurus pratensis – meadow foxtail
 Althaea
 X Althaea hirsuta – hairy marsh-mallow
 X Althaea officinalis – common marsh-mallow
 Alyssum
 X Alyssum alyssoides – pale alyssum, small alyssum, yellow alyssum, pale madwort
 X Alyssum murale – yellow-tuft

Am 

 Amaranthus
 X Amaranthus albus – white tumbleweed, tumble pigweed, tumbleweed amaranth
 X Amaranthus blitoides – prostrate amaranth, prostrate pigweed, matweed
 X Amaranthus blitum – purple amaranth
 X Amaranthus cruentus – blood amaranth, purple amaranth, red amaranth, caterpillar amaranth, African spinach
 X Amaranthus hybridus – smooth amaranth, hybrid amaranth, green pigweed, smooth pigweed, green amaranth
 X Amaranthus palmeri – Palmer's amaranth
 X Amaranthus powellii – green amaranth, Powell's smooth amaranth
 X Amaranthus retroflexus – redroot amaranth, redroot pigweed, wild-beet amaranth, rough pigweed
 X Amaranthus spinosus – spiny amaranth
 N Amaranthus tuberculatus – roughfruit amaranth, roughfruit waterhemp, tall waterhemp, tall pigweed
 Ambrosia
 N Ambrosia artemisiifolia – common ragweed, annual ragweed, annual bur-sage
 N Ambrosia psilostachya – perennial ragweed, western ragweed, naked-spike ambrosia, Cuman ragweed
 N Ambrosia trifida – giant ragweed, great ragweed, buffalo-weed, skeleton-leaf bur-sage
 Amelanchier
 N Amelanchier alnifolia – Saskatoonberry, northwestern serviceberry
 N Amelanchier arborea – downy serviceberry, downy juneberry, common serviceberry
 N Amelanchier bartramiana – mountain juneberry, Bartram's shadbush, Bartram's chuckleypear
 N Amelanchier canadensis – Canada serviceberry, swamp shadbush, thicket serviceberry
 N Amelanchier humilis – low serviceberry, running serviceberry
 N Amelanchier laevis – smooth juneberry, Allegheny serviceberry, smooth chuckleypear
 N Amelanchier sanguinea var. gaspensis – Gaspé roundleaf juneberry
 N Amelanchier sanguinea var. sanguinea – roundleaf juneberry, roundleaf serviceberry, Fernald's chuckleypear
 N Amelanchier stolonifera – running serviceberry, running juneberry, running chuckleypear
 N Amelanchier × intermedia (A. arborea × A. canadensis) – swamp sugarpear
 N Amelanchier × neglecta (A. bartramiana × A. laevis) – hybrid juneberry
 N Amelanchier × quinti-martii (A. arborea × A. bartramiana) – Quint-mart's serviceberry
 N Amelanchier × wiegandii (A. arborea × A. sanguinea) – Wiegand's serviceberry
 Amerorchis
 N Amerorchis rotundifolia – small roundleaf orchis, oneleaf orchid
 Ammannia
 N Ammannia robusta – scarlet ammannia  Endangered 
 Ammophila
 N Ammophila breviligulata – American beachgrass
 Amorpha
 N Amorpha canescens – leadplant, downy indigobush
 N Amorpha fruticosa – false indigo
 Amphicarpaea
 N Amphicarpaea bracteata – American hog-peanut

An 

 Anagallis
 X Anagallis arvensis – scarlet pimpernel
 Anaphalis
 N Anaphalis margaritacea – pearly everlasting
 Anchusa
 X Anchusa arvensis – small bugloss, annual bugloss, alkanet
 X Anchusa officinalis – common bugloss
 Andromeda
 N Andromeda glaucophylla – bog rosemary, rosemary-leaf marsh andromeda
 N Andromeda polifolia var. jamesiana – James Bay bog rosemary
 N Andromeda polifolia var. polifolia – northern bog rosemary, marsh holyrose
 Andropogon
 N Andropogon gerardii – big bluestem, turkeyfoot
 N Andropogon virginicus – broom-sedge
 Androsace
 ? Androsace occidentalis – western rock-jasmine
 N Androsace septentrionalis – pygmy-flower rock-jasmine, northern androsace
 Anemone
 N Anemone acutiloba – sharp-lobed hepatica, sharp-lobed liverleaf
 N Anemone americana – round-lobed hepatica, American liverleaf
 X Anemone blanda
 N Anemone canadensis –  Canada anemone, roundleaf thimbleweed
 N Anemone cylindrica – long-fruited anemone, thimbleweed, candle anemone, long-headed anemone
 N Anemone multifida –  cutleaf anemone, cliff anemone, early anemone
 N Anemone parviflora – northern anemone, small-flowered anemone
 N Anemone patens –  pasqueflower, prairie smoke, prairie crocus, cutleaf anemone
 N Anemone quinquefolia – wood anemone, snow-drops
 N Anemone richardsonii – Richardson's anemone, yellow anemone
 N Anemone virginiana – tall thimbleweed, riverbank anemone
 Anethum
 X Anethum graveolens – dill, Indian dill
 Angelica
 N Angelica atropurpurea – purplestem angelica, dark-purple alexanders, wild masterwort, great angelica
 ? Angelica lucida – seabeach angelica, shiny angelica
 X Angelica sylvestris
 ? Angelica venenosa – hairy angelica
 Anoda
 X Anoda cristata – crested anoda
 Antennaria
 N Antennaria howellii subsp. canadensis – Canada pussytoes
 N Antennaria howellii subsp. howellii – Howell's pussytoes
 N Antennaria howellii subsp. neodioica – northern pussytoes, common pussytoes
 N Antennaria howellii subsp. petaloidea – small pussytoes
 N Antennaria microphylla – littleleaf pussytoes
 N Antennaria neglecta – field pussytoes
 N Antennaria oxyphylla
 N Antennaria parlinii subsp. fallax – largeleaf pussytoes, deceitful pussytoes
 N Antennaria parlinii subsp. parlinii – Parlin's pussytoes, smooth pussytoes, plainleaf pussytoes
 N Antennaria parvifolia – small-leaf pussytoes, Rocky Mountain cudweed, Nuttall's pussytoes
 N Antennaria pulcherrima – showy pussytoes, handsome pussytoes
 N Antennaria rosea – rosy pussytoes, pink everlasting
 N Antennaria subviscosa
 Anthemis
 X Anthemis arvensis – corn chamomile, field chamomile
 X Anthemis cotula – mayweed, stinking chamomile, fœtid chamomile, dog fennel, stinking mayweed
 X Anthemis tinctoria – golden chamomile
 Anthoxanthum
 X Anthoxanthum odoratum – sweet vernalgrass, sweetgrass
 Anthriscus
 X Anthriscus cerefolium – common chervil
 X Anthriscus sylvestris – wild chervil, woodland chervil, cow parsley, beak-chervil
 Anthyllis
 X Anthyllis vulneraria – kidney vetch, lady's fingers
 Antirrhinum
 X Antirrhinum majus – common snapdragon
 X Antirrhinum orontium – lesser snapdragon

Ap 

 Apera
 X Apera interrupta – dense silky bentgrass, interrupted bentgrass, interrupted windgrass
 X Apera spica-venti – silky bentgrass
 Apios
 N Apios americana – American groundnut, Indian potato, wild bean, potato-bean
 Aplectrum
 N Aplectrum hyemale – puttyroot
 Apocynum
 N Apocynum androsaemifolium – spreading dogbane
 N Apocynum cannabinum – Indian hemp, clasping-leaf dogbane, prairie dogbane, velvet dogbane, amyroot
 N Apocynum sibiricum – clasping-leaved dogbane
 N Apocynum × floribundum (A. androsaemifolium × A. cannabinum) – intermediate dogbane, bitter dogbane

Aq 

 Aquilegia
 N Aquilegia brevistyla – small-flowered columbine
 N Aquilegia canadensis – Canadian columbine, red columbine
 X Aquilegia vulgaris – European columbine, garden columbine, culverwort, capon's feather

Ar 

 Arabidopsis
 X Arabidopsis thaliana – mouse-ear cress, wall-cress
 Arabis
 N Arabis alpina subsp. alpina – alpine rockcress
 X Arabis alpina subsp. caucasica – wall rockcress, grey rockcress
 N Arabis arenicola var. arenicola – arctic rockcress
 N Arabis arenicola var. pubescens – sand rockcress
 N Arabis canadensis – sicklepod
 N Arabis divaricarpa – limestone rockcress
 N Arabis drummondii – Drummond rockcress
 N Arabis glabra – tower-mustard
 N Arabis hirsuta var. adpressipilis – hairy rockcress, creamflower rockcress
 N Arabis hirsuta var. pycnocarpa – creamflower rockcress
 N Arabis holboelli var. retrofracta – Holboell's rockcress
 N Arabis holboelli var. secunda – bristly-leaved rockcress
 ? Arabis kamchatica – lyreleaf rockcress (species status disputed)
 N Arabis laevigata – smooth rockcress
 N Arabis lyrata – lyreleaf rockcress
 N Arabis shortii – Short's rockcress
 Aralia
 X Aralia elata – Japanese Angelica-tree, Chinese Angelica-tree
 N Aralia hispida – bristly spikenard, bristly sarsaparilla, dwarf elder
 N Aralia nudicaulis – wild sarsaparilla, small spikenard
 N Aralia racemosa – American spikenard, Indian-root, life-of-man, petty morel
 X Aralia spinosa – Hercules' club, Devil's walkingstick, prickly ash, Angelica tree, toothache tree
 Arceuthobium
 N Arceuthobium americanum – pine mistletoe, American mistletoe, lodgepole pine dwarf mistletoe
 N Arceuthobium pusillum – dwarf mistletoe, eastern dwarf mistletoe
 Arctagrostis
 N Arctagrostis latifolia – polargrass
 Arctium
 X Arctium lappa – great burdock
 X Arctium minus subsp. minus – common burdock
 X Arctium minus subsp. nemorosum – lesser burdock
 X Arctium pubens – wood burdock
 X Arctium tomentosum – woolly burdock, tomentose burdock
 X Arctium × nothum (A. lappa × A. minus) – hybrid burdock
 Arctophila
 N Arctophila fulva – pendant grass
 Arctostaphylos
 N Arctostaphylos alpina – alpine bearberry
 N Arctostaphylos rubra – red manzanita
 N Arctostaphylos uva-ursi – bearberry, kinnikinnick, mealberry
 Arenaria
 N Arenaria humifusa – creeping sandwort, low sandwort, spreading sandwort
 X Arenaria serpyllifolia – thymeleaf sandwort
 Arethusa
 N Arethusa bulbosa – dragon's mouth, swamp pink
 Argemone
 X Argemone mexicana – Mexican prickly-poppy
 Arisaema
 N Arisaema dracontium – green dragon  Special Concern 
 N Arisaema triphyllum – Jack-in-the-pulpit
 Aristida
 N Aristida basiramea – forktip threeawn  Endangered 
 N Aristida dichotoma – Shinner's threeawn
 N Aristida longespica var. geniculata – red threeawn
 N Aristida longespica var. longespica – slimspike threeawn
 X Aristida oligantha – prairie three-awn grass
 N Aristida purpurascens – arrow feather threeawn
 Aristolochia
 X Aristolochia clematitis – birthwort
 X Aristolochia macrophylla – pipevine
 Armeria
 N Armeria maritima – sea thrift, Labrador sea thrift, foxflower
 Armoracia
 X Armoracia rusticana – horseradish, red cole
 Arnica
 N Arnica angustifolia – narrowleaf arnica, arctic arnica, arctic leopardbane
 N Arnica chamissonis –  meadow arnica, Chamisso's arnica, leafy arnica, leafy leopardbane
 N Arnica cordifolia – heartleaf arnica, heartleaf leopardbane
 N Arnica lonchophylla – northern arnica, longleaf arnica, white-plumed arnica, spearleaf arnica
 Arnoglossum
 N Arnoglossum platagineum – tuberous Indian-plantain  Special Concern 
 Aronia
 N Aronia melanocarpa – black chokeberry
 Arrhenatherum
 X Arrhenatherum elatius – tall oatgrass, French rye, tuber oatgrass, bulbous oatgrass, false oat grass
 Artemisia
 X Artemisia abrotanum – southern wormwood, southernwood, lad's love, oldman
 X Artemisia absinthium – common wormwood, absinthe, absinthe wormwood, European wormwood
 X Artemisia annua – sweet sagewort, annual wormwood, sweet Annie, sweet wormwood, annual mugwort
 X Artemisia biennis – biennial wormwood
 N Artemisia campestris subsp. borealis – boreal wormwood, Canada wormwood
 N Artemisia campestris subsp. caudata – tall wormwood, beach wormwood, wild wormwood, threadleaf sagewort, sagewort wormwood
 N Artemisia dracunculus – wild tarragon, dragon wormwood, dragon sagewort, false tarragon, French tarragon, Russian tarragon
 N Artemisia frigida – fringed sagebrush, prairie sagebrush, fringed sagewort, prairie sagewort, wormwood sage, pasture sage, arctic sagebrush
 N Artemisia ludoviciana – white sage, silver wormwood, prairie sage, western mugwort, darkleaf mugwort, cudweed sagewort, pasture sage, Louisiana wormwood, Louisiana sage, silver king artemisia, white wormwood, white sagebrush
 X Artemisia pontica – Roman wormwood, petite wormwood, green ginger
 X Artemisia stelleriana – hoary sagebrush, dusty miller, beach wormwood, old woman
 N Artemisia tilesii – Tilesius' wormwood, mountain sagewort, oldwoman
 X Artemisia vulgaris – common mugwort, common wormwood
 Aruncus
 X Aruncus dioicus – common goat's-beard

As 

 Asarum
 N Asarum canadense – Canada wild ginger
 Asclepias
 N Asclepias exaltata – poke milkweed, tall milkweed, four-leaved milkweed
 N Asclepias hirtella – tall green milkweed
 N Asclepias incarnata – swamp milkweed
 N Asclepias ovalifolia – oval-leaf milkweed, dwarf milkweed
 N Asclepias purpurascens – purple milkweed
 N Asclepias quadrifolia – four-leaved milkweed
 N Asclepias sullivantii – Sullivant's milkweed
 N Asclepias syriaca – common milkweed, silkweed, silky swallow-wort
 N Asclepias tuberosa – butterfly weed, orange milkweed, pleurisy root, chigger flower
 ? Asclepias variegata – white milkweed
 N Asclepias verticillata – whorled milkweed
 N Asclepias viridiflora – green milkweed, green comet milkweed, short green milkweed
 Asimina
 N Asimina triloba – common pawpaw
 Asparagus
 X Asparagus officinalis – garden asparagus, asparagus-fern
 Asperugo
 X Asperugo procumbens – German madwort, catchweed
 Asperula
 X Asperula arvensis – blue woodruff
 Asplenium
 N Asplenium platyneuron – ebony spleenwort
 N Asplenium rhizophyllum – walking fern
 N Asplenium ruta-muraria – wall-rue
 N Asplenium scolopendrium var. americanum – American Hart's-tongue fern  Special Concern 
 N Asplenium trichomanes – maidenhair spleenwort
 N Asplenium viride – green spleenwort
 Aster
 N Aster alpinus – alpine aster
 Astragalus
 N Astragalus adsurgens – ascending milkvetch, rattle milkvetch, standing milkvetch
 N Astragalus agrestis – field milkvetch, mile-vetch, cock's-head
 N Astragalus alpinus – alpine milkvetch
 N Astragalus americanus – American milkvetch
 N Astragalus australis – Indian milkvetch
 N Astragalus canadensis – Canada milkvetch, Carolina milkvetch
 X Astragalus cicer – chickpea milkvetch
 N Astragalus eucosmus – elegant milkvetch, pretty milkvetch
 X Astragalus glycophyllos – wild liquorice
 N Astragalus neglectus – Cooper's milkvetch
 N Astragalus tenellus – pulse milkvetch, loose-flower milkvetch

At 

 Athyrium
 N Athyrium filix-femina var. angustum – northern lady fern
 N Athyrium filix-femina var. cyclosorum – northwestern lady fern
 Atriplex
 N Atriplex dioica – thickleaf orache, saline saltbush
 N Atriplex glabriuscula – smooth orache, Scotland orache, glabrous orache, northeastern saltbush
 X Atriplex heterosperma – two-scale orache
 X Atriplex hortensis – garden orache
 X Atriplex oblongifolia – oblong-leaf orache
 N Atriplex patula – spear orache, spreading orache, spearscale, halberdleaf orache, common orache
 N Atriplex prostrata – thinleaf orache, triangle orache, fat-hen
 X Atriplex rosea – tumbling orache

Au 

 Aureolaria
 N Aureolaria flava – yellow false-foxglove
 N Aureolaria pedicularia – fernleaf yellow false-foxglove
 N Aureolaria virginica – downy false-foxglove
 Aurinia
 X Aurinia saxatilis – basket-of-gold, gold dust, gold alyssum

Av 

 Avena
 X Avena fatua – wild oats
 X Avena sativa – oats, cultivated oats
 X Avena sterilis – animated oats

Ax 

 Axyris
 X Axyris amaranthoides – Russian pigweed, upright axyris

Az 

 Azolla
 N Azolla caroliniana – mosquito fern

References 

See: Flora of Canada#References

Plants by genus